Hirschbühl is a surname. Notable people with the surname include:

Alois Hirschbühl (1883–1950), Swiss painter and commander of the Pontifical Swiss Guard
Christian Hirschbühl (born 1990), Austrian alpine ski racer
Hansjörg Hirschbühl (born 1937), Swiss bobsledder 
Hans-Jörg Hirschbühl (born 1937), Swiss wrestler

German-language surnames